Lapiedra is a genus of Western Mediterranean plants in the Amaryllis family. It now contains only one known species, Lapiedra martinezii, native to Spain and Morocco.

Two other former species are considered members of other genera (Narcissus and Traubia).
 Lapiedra chilensis - Traubia modesta 
 Lapiedra gracilis - Narcissus cavanillesii

References

Bibliography 
 Rios et al. Biogeographical patterns and phenological changes in Lapiedra martinezii Lag. related to its alkaloid diversity. 2013

Amaryllidoideae
Monotypic Amaryllidaceae genera
Flora of Morocco
Flora of Spain
Taxa named by Mariano Lagasca